Nedeljko is a Serbian masculine given name. It may refer to:

Nedeljko Bajić Baja (born 1968), singer
Nedeljko Bulatović (born 1938), footballer and football manager
Nedeljko Čabrinović (1895–1916), revolutionary
Nedeljko Gvozdenović (1902–1988), painter
Nedeljko Jovanović (born 1970), handball player
Nedeljko Malić (born 1988), footballer
Nedeljko Milosavljević (born 1960), footballer
Nedeljko Vukoje (born 1943), footballer

See also
Nedeljković

Slavic masculine given names
Serbian masculine given names